Elisabeth Anne Gebhardt (12 April 1945 – 10 August 1995) was an English actress, best known for playing the part of form 5C pupil Maureen Bullock in the LWT sitcom Please Sir! (1968–71) and in the subsequent spin-off show, The Fenn Street Gang (1971–73).

Following on from her role in the show and its spin-off, she continued working in television, starring as Doreen Bissel in Dear Mother...Love Albert, and appearing in a number of supporting roles in programmes such as New Scotland Yard, Z-Cars, The Naked Civil Servant, Doctor on the Go, Grange Hill, The Bill, Love Hurts, Keeping Up Appearances and others. Her few film roles included the movie version of Please Sir! (1971), and a brief appearance as a maid in Julius Caesar (1970).

In her earlier years, Liz attended Willesden County Grammar School in North-West London

Death
Gebhardt was diagnosed with cancer and admitted to hospital in summer 1995; she died in August, aged 50. During her cancer treatment, she sustained injuries from radiotherapy, a situation which contributed to the formation of a campaign to prevent damage from such treatment.

Gebhardt was married to fellow actor and former director of the Regent’s Park Open Air Theatre, Ian Talbot.

Filmography

References

External links

English television actresses
Deaths from cancer in England
1945 births
1996 deaths
Actresses from London
Actresses from Liverpool
Alumni of the Guildhall School of Music and Drama
People educated at Willesden County Grammar School
20th-century British actresses
20th-century English women
20th-century English people